String Quartet No. 2, Musica Instrumentalis (1997) is a string quartet by Aaron Jay Kernis (b. 1960), inspired by renaissance and baroque dances, composed for the Lark Quartet and awarded the Pulitzer Prize in 1998, with a special citation to George Gershwin. His first quartet being named Musica celestis:

The piece was premiered by the Lark Quartet in January 1998 at Merkin Concert Hall. It has been recorded by the Lark Quartet and Jasper String Quartet.

It was commissioned by the Lark Quartet by the Elaine Kaufman Cultural Center in New York City, Ohio University, and The Schubert Club of St. Paul, with additional funds from Chamber Music America. It is dedicated to Linda Hoeschler "in gratitude for her friendship, generosity, and support, and in honor of her perpetual faith in the creative spirit."

Sources

External links
"Aaron Jay Kernis : String Quartet No. 2, 'musica instrumentalis'", G. Schirmer Inc.
"Prizing the Pulitzer", CoriglianoQuartet.com.

Compositions by Aaron Jay Kernis
1997 compositions
Kernis 2
Pulitzer Prize for Music-winning works
Contemporary classical compositions